Ten Thousand Lightyears is the seventh studio album by Boney M. and the first to feature new member Reggie Tsiboe, who had taken over Bobby Farrell's role as the band's leading man in early 1982.

Background
After a break in the spring of 1983 when Liz Mitchell gave birth to her second child, and Marcia Barrett recorded demos with Eddy Grant, the band issued "Jambo - Hakuna Matata (No Problems)" backed with a new remix of "African Moon" from the Boonoonoonoos album. 

During the winter of 1983/1984, new recordings were made, and the album was then given a whole new approach. It was supposed have been a continuation of the ethno-African themes, both musically and lyrically, of 1981's Boonoonoonoos, but after the miscalculation with "Jambo", most of the new tracks which ultimately ended up as the side A suite were given a science fiction theme, and the album title Ten Thousand Lightyears was chosen. Launched with a ZDF TV-special, the album was finally released in May 1984 and was also Boney M.'s debut on the new compact disc format.

The single chosen to promote the finished album was the ballad "Somewhere in the World"; it became the fourth consecutive Boney M. single not to reach the German Top 40.

Track listing
All Songs Copyright Far Music.
Hansa LP 206 200-620 (Germany, May 1984) 
Side A:
"Exodus (Noah's Ark 2001)"  (Davis, Farian, Kawohl) - 5:19
"Wild Planet"  (Bischof, Farian; written as "Wild Jlanet" on the version issued by Music Box Records in Greece) - 4:06
"Future World" (Bischof, Farian) - 3:48
"Where Did You Go?"  (Bischof, Kawohl) - 4:09
"10.000 Lightyears" (Bischof, Bjorklund, Farian, Kawohl) - 4:32
"I Feel Good" (Bischof, Farian, Barzscht) -  3:05

Side B:
"Somewhere in the World"  (Davis, Grohe, Keilhauer) -  4:38
"Bel Ami"  (Bischof, Farian, Rainford)  3:12
"Living Like a Moviestar"  (Bischof, Farian, Kawohl) -  3:04
"Dizzy"  (Tommy Roe, Freddy Weller) -  3:28
"The Alibama"  (Davis, Farian, Reyam) -  3:11
"Jimmy" (Farian, Howell, Daansen, Liz Mitchell) - 3:02
 1982 re-recording
"Barbarella Fortuneteller" (Davis, Farian, Kawohl) - 2:58

Personnel
 Liz Mitchell - lead vocals (All tracks except "Dizzy", "Barbarella Fortuneteller" and "Kalimba de Luna"), backing vocals
 Frank Farian - backing vocals, rap on "Dizzy"
 Reggie Tsiboe - lead vocals "Wild Planet", "Barbarella Fortuneteller" and "Kalimba de Luna", backing vocals
 Marcia Barrett - lead vocal "Wild Planet", backing vocals
 La Mama (Madeleine Davis, Patricia Shockley, Judy Cheeks) - backing vocals "Future World", "I Feel Good", "Barbarella Fortuneteller", "The Alibama" and "Kalimba De Luna".
 Amy Goff - backing vocals "10.000 Lightyears", "Dizzy" and "Kalimba de Luna"
 Elaine Goff - backing vocals "10.000 Lightyears", "Dizzy" and "Kalimba de Luna"
 Bill Swisher - narrator on "Wild Planet"
 Sandy Davis - lead vocals "Dizzy", "The Alibama" (promotional-only LP version)
 Mrs. Hanson and Children - additional vocals on "Exodus"
 Max Greger - keyboards
 Curt Cress - drums
 Bronwen Collins - bassoon
 Johan Daansen - guitar
 Mats Björklund - guitar
 Pit Löw - keyboards
 Christian Schneider - saxophone
 Kristian Schultze - keyboards
 Dino Solera - saxophone
 Munich String Orchestra - orchestra
 London Philharmonic Orchestra - orchestra

Production
 Frank Farian - producer
 Dietmar Kawohl - arranger
 Stefan Klinkhammer - arranger
 Harry Baierl - arranger
 Kristian Schultze - arranger
 Carmine Di - engineer
 Zeke Lund - engineer
 Ralph P. Rupert - engineer

Charts

Weekly charts

Reissued
 1994: CD, BMG, 74321 21266 2
 2007: CD, Sony BMG Music Entertainment, 88697094822
 2017: Boney M. Complete, 9 LP, Sony Music, 88985406971

References

External links
 Rate Your Music, detailed discography
 Discogs.com, detailed discography
 [ Allmusic, biography, discography etc.]
 Boney M. FAQ

1984 albums
Boney M. albums
Albums produced by Frank Farian
Hansa Records albums